Qoroq Aqa (also Romanized as Qoroq Āqā; also known as Qal‘eh-ye Qoroq and Qarqābād) is a village in Ashiyan Rural District, in the Central District of Lenjan County, Isfahan Province, Iran. At the 2006 census, its population was 62, in 17 families.

References 

Populated places in Lenjan County